G'olé! is the official documentary film of the 1982 FIFA World Cup held in Spain.

The film is narrated by Sean Connery and the score was written by Rick Wakeman. It tells the story of the 1982 FIFA World Cup which was won by Italy who beat West Germany in the final. It also highlights New Zealand - who played the most games in order to qualify - and Cameroon, a rising African force.

Distribution
United Kingdom: 21 March 1983 (preview)
Italy: 13 April 1983 (TV premiere)
Finland: 11 November 1984 (TV premiere)

Soundtrack

Track listing
 "International Flag" –  2:15
 "The Dove (opening ceremony)" – 2:40
 "Wayward Spirit" – 3:22
 "Latin Reel (Theme From G'olé)" – 2:47
 "Red Island" – 5:06
 "Spanish Holiday" – 2:46
 "No Possible" – 2:57
 "Shadows" – 3:41
 "Black Pearls" - 2:54
 "Frustration" - 3:12
 "Spanish Montage" - 2:48
 "G'olé" - 2:58

References

External links

FIFA World Cup official films
1982 FIFA World Cup
1983 films
Rick Wakeman albums
Documentary films about association football
Documentary films about Spain
1983 documentary films
Films scored by Rick Wakeman
Films directed by Tom Clegg (director)
1980s English-language films
British sports documentary films
1980s British films